The Vorarlberg Football Association (German: Vorarlberger Fussballverband; VFV) is the umbrella organization of the football clubs of the Austrian state Vorarlberg. The VFV was founded in 1920 and has its headquarters in Hohenems.

The VFV is one of 8 regional organizations of the Austrian Football Association (ÖFB).

The VFV is provider of the Fussballakademie Vorarlberg in Bregenz.

References

External links
 VFV website 

Football in Austria
Sport in Vorarlberg